Ağqıraq (also, Ağqıraqlı) is a village in the Yevlakh Rayon of Azerbaijan. The village forms part of the municipality of Balçılı.

References 

Populated places in Yevlakh District